Low Marnham is a small village 12 miles east of Edwinstowe, in the civil parish of Marnham, in the Bassetlaw district, in the county of Nottinghamshire, England. Located in the village is St Wilfrid's Church, a grade I listed building.

References

External links

Villages in Nottinghamshire
Bassetlaw District